Beauval, Saskatchewan is a northern village located in Northern Saskatchewan, near Lac Île-à-la-Crosse. It was founded in the early 20th century as a Roman Catholic mission and as a transportation centre.

Highway 165 goes through the community. Highway 918 three kilometres east leads north to Patuanak. Eight kilometres east is the hamlet of Lac La Plonge on Lac La Plonge. Eight kilometres west where Highway 165 joins Highway 155 is Beauval Forks. The Beauval Airport along with several businesses are located there. 
 
Beauval is situated in the valley of the Beaver River hence the name "beautiful valley" or "beau val" in French. The population of Beauval was 756 in 2011.

History 
The earliest known settler was Philip Yew who arrived in 1905, by 1907, others have arrived, mainly from Dore Lake. In 1910, Alexander Laliberte opened a fur trading store to serve the local trappers. It served as an outpost. In 1969, the community established the 'Beauval Local Community Authority', which elected council to oversee bylaws, collect taxes and maintain law and order. Unlike most Northern Saskatchewan communities, Beauval has seen a population growth over the years. By the end of the Second World War, Beauval had a population of approximately 350 residents, today the population is over 1,000 residents with an additional 200 living in the surrounding area.

Beauval Residential School 

La Plonge 192 (Indian Reserve) where the Beauval Residential School was located is across the river from Beauval and had 115 residents in 2011. La Plonge 192 is part of the English River Dene Nation.

Beauval Indian Residential School opened in 1895 and closed in 1983. It then became the Meadow Lake Tribal Council's Beauval Indian Education Centre which closed in 1995. The building has since been demolished.

A fire in 1927 and a flu epidemic in 1936 took the lives of many of the students.

Demographics 

Economy 
Today, Beauval derives its economic resources from limited commercial fishing, very little trapping, local and provincial government subsidies, grants and programs, the mines, local businesses and the school. Tourism and recreation activities also provides economic resources.

Transportation 
The community is served by Beauval Airport. There are dirt roads which connect Beauval to neighbouring communities.

See also 
List of Indian residential schools in Canada

References 

Division No. 18, Saskatchewan
Northern villages in Saskatchewan
Hudson's Bay Company trading posts